Günther Fielmann (born 17 September 1939) is a German billionaire businessman, the founder, majority owner and the former chief executive officer of Fielmann, a German optics company focusing on retail eyewear. As of August 2021, his net worth is estimated at US$5.8 billion

Career

1972 the state-approved optometrist opened his first shop in Cuxhaven. In 1981 he revolutionised the German spectacle market by offering 90 fashionable frames for the allowance of the statutory health insurance funds (initial tariff). Because previously only 6 models were available in exchange for the insurance allowance, Fielmann thus removed the social stigma of having to wear glasses. This liberalisation, favourable media coverage ("Robin Hood of spectacle wearers") and aggressive marketing allowed his business to grow rapidly. In 1982 a new shop was opened in Kiel offering more than 7,000 frames to choose from. In 1994 the Fielmann KG was transformed into Fielmann AG and went public.

In 2002, Fielmann bought Plön Castle from the state of Schleswig-Holstein and had it renovated extensively. Since 2003 he trains his optometrists in the castle. From 2005/06 onwards bachelor's and master's degrees in optometry are being offered in cooperation with the University of Applied Sciences Lübeck.

Personal life
Fielmann has two children with Heike Fielmann from whom he is divorced. His son, Marc Fielmann, is said to take over the company one day.

Other activities
For each of his employees Fielmann plants a tree every year. In May 2009 he planted the one-millionth tree with chancellor Angela Merkel and minister president Peter Harry Carstensen.

Fielmann is also a passionate organic farmer. He owns the 1,600 hectares manor Schierensee, the 470 hectares manor Marutendorf in Achterwehr, the 180 hectares farm Möglin in Krummwisch and a farm in Lütjensee. The organic products of his farms he sells under the brand Hof Lütjensee.

Awards
In 2000 Fielmann received the Federal Cross of Merit First Class from the state of Schleswig-Holstein. Two years later (2002) the state also bestowed the title of a professor (honoris causis) upon him. In 2003 he received the "Deutscher Gründerpreis" (Prize for German Founders). The agricultural and nutrition sciences department of the University of Kiel awarded him an honorary doctorate in December 2004. In 2011 Fielmann  was accepted into the Hall of Fame of manager magazin.

External links 
 Bloomberg Businessweek (2011) "Hidden Billionaires: Günther Fielmann"
 NDR-Portrait (2009) "Günther Fielmann - Der Weitblicker" (German video)

References 

1939 births
Living people
People from Rendsburg-Eckernförde
People from the Province of Schleswig-Holstein
German businesspeople in retailing
German chief executives
Commanders Crosses of the Order of Merit of the Federal Republic of Germany
German billionaires
German company founders
20th-century German businesspeople
21st-century German businesspeople